Zhao Bo (born 17 September 1993) is a Chinese professional footballer currently playing for Chinese Super League club Zhejiang Professional as a goalkeeper.

Club career
Zhao Bo would be promoted to the senior team of Baoding Yingli ETS in the 2016 China League Two season, where he established himself as a regular while the team gained promotion to the second tier. He would unfortunately be part of the team that was immediately relegated back into the third tier the following season. On 29 January 2019 he transferred to second tier club Zhejiang Professional as their second choice goalkeeper. He would eventually go on to make his debut in a league game against Jiangxi Beidamen on 4 October 2020 in a 2-0 victory. He would be a squad player as the club gained promotion to the top tier at the end of the 2021 campaign.

Career statistics
.

References

External links
Haoxiang Jin at Worldfootball.net

1993 births
Living people
Chinese footballers
Association football goalkeepers
China League Two players
China League One players
Guangzhou City F.C. players
Zhejiang Professional F.C. players